Harkabud-e Golzar (also Romanized as Harkabūd-e Golzār; also known as Golzār and Golzār-e Harkabūd) is a village in Arkavazi Rural District, Chavar District, Ilam County, Ilam Province, Iran. At the 2006 census, its population was 229, in 43 families. The village is populated by Kurds.

References 

Populated places in Ilam County
Kurdish settlements in Ilam Province